Imparable is the second studio album by Colombian singer-songwriter Naela, released on March 18, 2014, by My Major Company.

Track listing

References

External links 

2014 albums
Naëla albums
My Major Company albums
The Light Entertainment albums
Spanish-language albums